Balil or Belil may refer to:
 Balil, Ardabil
 Belil, Yazd